Abassin Alikhil (Dari: اباسين علی خیل; born 19 April 1991) is an Afghan professional footballer who plays as a defensive midfielder for SC Hessen Dreieich.

References 

1991 births
Living people
Footballers from Frankfurt
German people of Afghan descent
Sportspeople of Afghan descent
Association football defenders
Afghan men's footballers
Afghanistan international footballers
German footballers
Eintracht Frankfurt players
FSV Frankfurt players
Viktoria Aschaffenburg players
Footballers at the 2014 Asian Games
SC Hessen Dreieich players
Eintracht Frankfurt II players
Hessenliga players
Asian Games competitors for Afghanistan